In extremal graph theory, the forbidden subgraph problem is the following problem: given a graph , find the maximal number of edges  an -vertex graph can have such that it does not have a subgraph isomorphic to . In this context,  is called a forbidden subgraph.

An equivalent problem is how many edges in an -vertex graph guarantee that it has a subgraph isomorphic to ?

Definitions 

Upper bounds

Turán's theorem 

Turán's theorem states that for positive integers  satisfying , 

Equality cases for Turán's theorem come from the Turán graph .

This intuition turns out to be correct, up to  error.

Erdős–Stone theorem 

Erdős–Stone theorem states that for all positive integers  and all graphs , 

Bipartite graphs 
For bipartite graphs , the Erdős–Stone theorem only tells us that . The forbidden subgraph problem for bipartite graphs is known as the Zarankiewicz problem, and it is unsolved in general.

Progress on the Zarankiewicz problem includes following theorem:

Kővári–Sós–Turán theorem.

Another result for bipartite graphs is the case of even cycles, . Even cycles are handled by considering a root vertex and paths branching out from this vertex. If two paths of the same length  have the same endpoint and do not overlap, then they create a cycle of length . This gives the following theorem.

Theorem (Bondy and Simonovits, 1974). There exists some constant  such that  for every positive integer  and positive integer .

A powerful lemma in extremal graph theory is dependent random choice. This lemma allows us to handle bipartite graphs with bounded degree in one part:

Theorem (Alon, Krivelevich, and Sudakov, 2003). Let  be a bipartite graph with vertex parts  and  such that every vertex in  has degree at most . Then there exists a constant  (dependent only on ) such that for every positive integer .

In general, we have the following conjecture.:

Rational Exponents Conjecture (Erdős and Simonovits). For any finite family  of graphs, if there is a bipartite , then there exists a rational  such that .

A survey by Füredi and Simonovits describes progress on the forbidden subgraph problem in more detail.

Lower bounds 
There are various techniques used for obtaining the lower bounds.

Probabilistic method 
While this method mostly gives weak bounds, the theory of random graphs is a rapidly developing subject. It is based on the idea that if we take a graph randomly with a sufficiently small density, the graph would contain only a small number of subgraphs of  inside it.

The probabilistic method can be used to prove where  is a constant only depending on the graph . For the construction we can take the Erdős-Rényi random graph , that is the graph with  vertices and the edge been any two vertices drawn with probability , independently. Therefore, at least one -vertex graph exists with at least as many edges as the expected number.

This method can also be used to find the constructions of a graph for bounds on the girth of the graph.

Algebraic constructions 
For specific cases, improvements have been made by finding algebraic constructions. A common feature for such constructions is that it involves the use of geometry to construct a graph, with vertices representing geometric objects and edges according to the algebraic relations between the vertices.

First, suppose that  for some prime . This graph is -free because a system of two linear equations in  cannot have more than one solution. So there are at least  edges, as desired.

Theorem (Brown, 1966). 
Proof outline. Then this is -free since at most two points lie in the intersection of three spheres.

Theorem (Alon et al., 1999) For ,

Randomized Algebraic constructions 
This technique combines the above two ideas. It uses random polynomial type relations when defining the incidences between vertices, which are in some algebraic set. Using this technique to prove the following theorem.

Theorem: For every , there exists some  such that .

Due to the prime gaps, we have . Let the graph  have the vertex set  such that two vertices  are adjacent if . 

We fix a set , and defining a set  as the elements of  not in  satisfying  for all elements . The resulting graph turns out to be  free, and at least one graph exists with the expectation of the number of edges of this resulting graph.

Supersaturation 

Supersaturation refers to a variant of the forbidden subgraph problem, where we consider when some -uniform graph  contains many copies of some forbidden subgraph . Intuitively, one would expect this to once  contains significantly more than  edges. We introduce Turán density to formalize this notion.

Turán density 

The Turán density of a -uniform graph  is defined to be 

 

It is true that  is in fact positive and monotone decreasing, so the limit must therefore exist. 

As an example, Turán's Theorem gives that , and the Erdős–Stone theorem gives that . In particular, for bipartite , . Determining the Turán density  is equivalent to determining  up to an  error.

Supersaturation Theorem 

Consider an -uniform hypergraph  with  vertices.

Applications 

We may solve various forbidden subgraph problems by considering supersaturation-type problems. We restate and give a proof sketch of the Kővári–Sós–Turán theorem below: 

Kővári–Sós–Turán theorem.
Proof. Given a vertex of degree , we get exactly  copies of  rooted at this vertex, for a total of  copies. Here,  when .

In this proof, we are using the supersaturation method by considering the number of occurrences of a smaller subgraph. Typically, applications of the supersaturation method do not use the supersaturation theorem. Other theorems regarding the forbidden subgraph problem which can be solved with supersaturation include:

Generalizations 

There are also hypergraph versions of forbidden subgraph problems that are much more difficult. For instance, Turán's problem may be generalized to asking for the largest number of edges in an -vertex 3-uniform hypergraph that contains no tetrahedra. However, the best known upper bound is 0.562, using the technique of flag algebras.

See also 
Biclique-free graph
Erdős–Hajnal conjecture
Turán's theorem
Turán number
Subgraph isomorphism problem
Forbidden graph characterization
Erdős-Stone theorem
Zarankiewicz problem
Extremal graph theory

References 

Extremal graph theory